Edward Watson may refer to:

Edward Watson (died 1617), MP for Stamford
Edward Watson (dancer) (born 1976), dancer with the Royal Ballet
Edward Watson (footballer) (1901–1986), English footballer
Edward Watson, 2nd Baron Rockingham (1630–1689), English landowner and peer
Edward Watson, Viscount Sondes (1686–1722), English politician, MP for Canterbury
Edward B. Watson (1844–1915), 12th Chief Justice of the Oregon Supreme Court
Edward H. Watson (1874–1942), United States Navy officer
Edward William Watson (1859–1936), professor of ecclesiastical history
Edward Yerbury Watson (died 1897), English entomologist
Ted Watson (Edward George Watson), English footballer

See also
Ed Watson (disambiguation)